Newmeyer is a surname. Notable people with the surname include: 

Don Newmeyer (1902–1992), American player and coach of gridiron football, father of Julie Newmar
Fred C. Newmeyer (1888–1967), American actor, film director and film producer
Frederick Newmeyer (born 1944), American linguist and university professor
Julia Chalene Newmeyer (born 1933), American actress, dancer and singer known by her stage name, Julie Newmar

See also
Neumeier